Blewitt Springs is a semi-rural suburb of Adelaide, South Australia. It is within the City of Onkaparinga.

See also
European settlement of South Australia

References

Suburbs of Adelaide